The wolf herrings are a family (Chirocentridae) of two marine species of ray-finned fish related to the herrings.

Both species have elongated bodies and jaws with long sharp teeth that facilitate their ravenous appetites, mostly for other fish. Both species reach a length of 1 m. They have silvery sides and bluish backs.

They are commercially fished, and marketed fresh or frozen.

Species
 Chirocentrus dorab (Forsskål, 1775) - Dorab wolf-herring, found in warm coastal waters from the Red Sea to Japan and Australia
 Chirocentrus nudus Swainson, 1839 - whitefin wolf-herring, found in a similar range  (This species is difficult to distinguish from C. dorab; the former has a black mark on its dorsal fin.  This species is also known to eat crabs in addition to its usual diet of smaller fish.)

References

 
Fish of the Indian Ocean
Extant Eocene first appearances
Taxa named by Georges Cuvier